Altanbulag is a Mongolian place name which may refer to:

 Altanbulag, Selenge, a sum of Selenge Province, near the border with Russia
 Altanbulag, Töv, a sum of Töv Province

See also
Sums of Mongolia, a type of administrative division